Tahpenes (תַּחְפְּנֵיס/תַּחְפְּנֵס Taḥpənēs; LXX Θεκεμιμας Thekemimas, or Θεχεμινας Thekheminas; possibly derived from Egyptian tꜣ ḥmt nswt, meaning the wife of the king, Late Egyptian pronunciation: /taʔ ˈħiːmə ʔənˈsiːʔ/) was an Egyptian queen mentioned in the First Book of Kings. She appeared in 1 Kings 11:19–20, where the Egyptian pharaoh awarded Hadad the Edomite with Tahpenes' sister in marriage. Tahpenes weaned the son of Hadad and her sister - Genubath, who was also raised in the pharaoh's household.

Tahpenes also references a location, likely a city in ancient Egypt. In this context, Tahpenes is mentioned in the Book of Jeremiah 2:16.

References

Ancient Egyptian queens consort
Books of Kings people
Women in the Hebrew Bible
Egypt in the Hebrew Bible